The Minière is a short mountain river that flows through the Alpes-Maritimes department of southeastern France. It flows into the Bieugne (a tributary of the Roya) west of Tende, where a dam forms the Lac des Mesches.

References

Rivers of France
Rivers of Alpes-Maritimes
Rivers of Provence-Alpes-Côte d'Azur